Penicillium brevicompactum is a mould species in the genus Penicillium.

Mycophenolic acid can be isolated from P. brevicompactum.

References

brevicompactum
Fungi described in 1901